Chieko Naniwa (浪花 千栄子) (November 19, 1907 – December 22, 1973) was a Japanese actress who was active from the 1920s to the 1970s. She is best known for playing geisha in several films, such as Keiji Mizoguchi's A Geisha, and the Forest Spirit in Akira Kurosawa's Throne of Blood. Her birth name was Kikuno Nanko.

Early life 
Naniwa was born to poultry farmers in what is now Tondabayashi, Osaka, Japan on November 19, 1907. When she was 8 years old she began working at a bento shop in Dotonbori. After that she worked as a waitress in Kyoto until she was 18, when she entered a theater troupe.

Career 
She made her film debut in 's first film "Kaettekita eiyu". She obtained roles easily after that, working with famous film actors like Utaemon Ichikawa and Ichikawa Momonosuke. However, she cut ties with the film industry after troubles with unpaid wages.

In 1930 she joined  and 's Shochiku theater. She married Shibuya that year. In 1948, Shibuya started his own theater called the Shochiku Shinkigeki, where Naniwa was the lead actress. Naniwa left the theater in 1951 after Shibuya had a child with another actress in the company.

Naniwa began performing in radio dramas. She also began appearing in films again, such as in Kenji Mizoguchi's A Geisha (1953), which won her a Blue Ribbon Award. She also performed with Hisaya Morishige in Meoto Zenzai (1955), in Akira Kurosawa's Throne of Blood (1957) and Yasujiro Ozu's Equinox Flower (1958).

She opened an inn in the Tenryu-ji, a temple in Kyoto's Arashiyama district. Shortly after opening the inn, she let Mizoguchi borrow it to film The Crucified Lovers (1954), and taught the star of the film, Kyoko Kagawa, how to act in a kimono.

Naniwa died of gastrointestinal bleeding on December 22, 1973. After her death she was posthumously awarded the Order of the Sacred Treasure.

Filmography

Film performances

TV performances

Selected bibliography

References

External links 

 

1973 deaths
1907 births
People from Osaka Prefecture
Japanese actresses
Recipients of the Order of the Sacred Treasure, 4th class